Luciano Capicchioni (14 July 1946 – 2 March 2021) was a Sammarinese-American sports agent.

Biography
As a teenager, Capicchioni moved to the United States with his father and two sisters. In 1965, he founded the cycling team at Michigan State University. Upon his return to Europe, he founded the San Marino Basketball Federation. From 1979 to 1984, he served as Vice-President of the Sammarinese National Olympic Committee, a position in which he oversaw the Olympic Games in Los Angeles and Moscow.

In 1986, Capicchioni founded the agency Interperformances, which represented professional athletes worldwide, including Toni Kukoč, Predrag Danilović, Arvydas Sabonis, Peja Stojaković, Zydrunas Ilgauskas, and Manu Ginóbili. He also represented soccer, American football, volleyball, and baseball players. His son, Manuel, joined the company in 1998.

In 2002, Capicchioni became owner of the basketball club Basket Rimini Crabs of the Italian . He left the team in 2006 but made a significant monetary contribution in March 2010, allowing the financially-troubled club to compete for the remainder of the season. Throughout the next few years, he helped to remedy the club's financial struggles, which resulted in its survival. In 2018, he restructured the club maintaining only the youth team, but then sold it entirely to Rinascita Basket Rimini.

Luciano Capicchioni died on 2 March 2021 in San Marino at the age of 74.

References

1946 births
2021 deaths
American people of Sammarinese descent
Sammarinese people in sports
People from Rimini